John Greene (died 16 June 1883) was an Irish landowner and politician from County Kilkenny.

At the 1847 general election, Greene was elected to the United Kingdom House of Commons in Westminster as one of the two Members of Parliament (MPs) for the County Kilkenny constituency. He was re-elected at the next three general elections, and held the seat until his defeat at the 1865 general election by George Leopold Bryan. He was first elected as Repeal Association candidate, and thereafter as a Liberal Independent (1852), a member of the Independent Irish Party in 1857, and as a Liberal in 1859 and at his defeat in 1865.

References

External links 
 

    
    
    

Year of birth missing
1883 deaths
People from County Kilkenny
Members of the Parliament of the United Kingdom for County Kilkenny constituencies (1801–1922)
UK MPs 1847–1852
UK MPs 1852–1857
UK MPs 1857–1859
UK MPs 1859–1865
Irish Liberal Party MPs
Irish Repeal Association MPs